Chojnowski (feminine: Chojnowska; plural: Chojnowscy) is a Polish surname. Notable people with this surname include:

 Krystyna Chojnowska-Liskiewicz (1936–2021), Polish naval engineer and sailor
 Patryk Chojnowski (born 1990), Polish para table tennis player
 Silvana Chojnowski (born 1994), Polish footballer

See also
 
 Chojnów Landscape Park

Polish-language surnames